Sima Guang (17 November 1019 – 11 October 1086), courtesy name Junshi, was a Chinese historian, politician, and writer. He was a high-ranking Song dynasty scholar-official who authored the monumental history book Zizhi Tongjian. Sima was a political conservative who opposed Wang Anshi's reforms.

Early life
Sima Guang was named after his birthplace Guāng Prefecture, where his father Sima Chi served as a county magistrate in Guangshan County. The Simas were originally from Xia County in Shǎn Prefecture, and claimed descent from Cao Wei's official Sima Fu in the 3rd century. A famous anecdote relates how the young Sima Guang once saved a playmate who had fallen into an enormous vat full of water. As other children scattered in panic, Sima Guang calmly picked up a rock and smashed a hole in the base of the pot. Water leaked out, and his friend was saved from drowning.

At age 6, Sima Guang once heard a lecture on the 4th-century BC history book Zuo Zhuan. Fascinated, he was able to retell the stories to his family when he returned home. He became an avid reader, "to the point of not recognizing hunger, thirst, coldness or heat".

Sima Guang obtained early success as a scholar and officer. When he was barely twenty, he passed the Imperial examination with the highest rank of jìnshì (進士 "metropolitan graduate"), and spent the next several years in official positions.

Professional life
Sima Guang is best remembered for his masterwork, Zizhi Tongjian, and the Australian sinologist Rafe de Crespigny describes him as "perhaps the greatest of all Chinese historians" .

In 1064, Sima presented to Emperor Yingzong of Song the five-volume (卷) Liniantu (歷年圖 "Chart of Successive Years"). It chronologically summarized events in Chinese history from 403 BCE to 959 CE, and served as a prospectus for sponsorship of his ambitious project in historiography. These dates were chosen because 403 BCE was the beginning of the Warring States period, when the ancient State of Jin was subdivided, which eventually led to the establishment of the Qin Dynasty; and because 959 CE was the end of the Five Dynasties and Ten Kingdoms period and the beginning of the Song dynasty.

In 1066, he presented a more detailed eight-volume Tongzhi (通志; "Comprehensive Records"), which chronicled Chinese history from 403 BCE to 207 BCE (the end of the Qin dynasty). The emperor issued an edict for the compilation of a groundbreaking universal history of China, granting full access to imperial libraries, and allocating funds for the costs of compilation, including research assistance by experienced historians such as Liu Ban (劉攽, 1022–88), Liu Shu (劉恕, 1032–78), and Fan Zuyu (范祖禹, 1041–98). After Yingzong died in 1067, Sima was invited to the palace to introduce his work-in-progress to Emperor Shenzong of Song. The new emperor not only confirmed the interest his father had shown, but showed his favor by bestowing an imperial preface in which he changed the title from Tongzhi ("Comprehensive Records") to Zizhi Tongjian ("Comprehensive Mirror to Aid in Government"). Scholars interpret the "Mirror" of the title to denote a work of reference and guidance, indicating that Shenzong accepted Sima as his guide in the study of history and its application to government. The emperor maintained his support for the compilation of this comprehensive history until its completion in 1084.

From the late 1060s, Sima came to assume a role as leader of what has been identified as a conservative faction at court, resolutely opposed to the New Policies of Chancellor Wang Anshi. Sima presented increasingly critical memorials to the throne until 1070, when he refused further appointment and withdrew from court. In 1071, he took up residence in Luoyang, where he remained with an official sinecure, providing sufficient time and resources to continue the compilation of Zizhi Tongjian. Though the historian and the emperor continued to disagree on policies, Sima's enforced retirement proved essential for him to complete his chronological history over the following one and a half decades. Contemporary accounts relate that to work more and sleep less when he was writing his great opus, the Zizhi Tongjian, he had a wooden pillow made from a log, designed to slip from under his head whenever he rolled over. He called this Jingzhen 警枕 (Alert Pillow), and used it throughout the period of Zizhi Tongjian's compilation.

Death

Emperor Shenzong died in 1085, shortly after Sima had submitted Zizhi Tongjian to the throne. Sima was recalled to court and appointed to lead the government under Emperor Zhezong of Song. He used this time in power to repeal many of the New Policies, but he died the following year, in 1086.

Achievements
As well as his achievements as a statesman and historian, Sima Guang was also a lexicographer (who perhaps edited the Jiyun), and spent decades compiling his 1066 Leipian ("Classified Chapters", cf. the Yupian) dictionary. It was based on the Shuowen Jiezi, and included 31,319 Chinese characters, many of which were coined in the Song and Tang dynasty. His Family Precepts of Sima Guang (司馬溫公家訓) is also widely known and studied in China and Japan.

See also
Zizhi Tongjian
Sushui Jiwen
Twenty-Four Histories
Chancellor of China
History of the Song dynasty
Fan Zhongyan
Wang Anshi

References

 
 .
Ji Xiao-bin (2005), Politics and Conservatism in Northern Song China: The Career and Thought of Sima Guang (1019–1086), Hong Kong: Chinese University Press. 
Pulleyblank, Edwin G. (1961). "Chinese Historical Criticism: Liu Chih-chi and Ssu-ma Kuang," in Historians of China and Japan, William G. Beasley and Edwin G. Pulleyblank, eds., Oxford: Oxford University Press, pp. 135–66.
 Strange, Mark (2014), "Sima Guang", in Berkshire Dictionary of Chinese Biography, Kerry Brown, ed., Great Barrington, MA: Berkshire Publishing, vol. 2, pp. 664–683. 
 Joseph P Yap (2009), Wars With the Xiongnu – A translation From Zizhi tongjian, Extract translations on Qin, Han, Xin and Xiongnu and Introduction. AuthorHouse.

External links

Emperor Huan and Emperor Ling, Zizhi Tongjian Chapters 54–59 (157–189 BCE), translated and annotated by Rafe de Crespigny

1019 births
1086 deaths
11th-century Chinese historians
11th-century Chinese people
Chinese scholars
Historians from Henan
Politicians from Xinyang
Song dynasty chancellors
Song dynasty historians
Song dynasty politicians from Henan
Writers from Xinyang
Royal tutors